James J. Burke (died 12 May 1964) was an Irish Fine Gael politician. A farmer by profession, he was elected to Dáil Éireann as a Fine Gael Teachta Dála (TD) for the Roscommon constituency at the 1954 general election. He was re-elected at the 1957 and 1961 general elections. He died in office in 1964, and the July 1964 by-election held for his seat was won by his widow Joan Burke.

See also
Families in the Oireachtas

References

Year of birth missing
1964 deaths
Fine Gael TDs
20th-century Irish farmers
Members of the 15th Dáil
Members of the 16th Dáil
Members of the 17th Dáil
Politicians from County Roscommon
Spouses of Irish politicians
21st-century Irish farmers